Thomas Healey may refer to:

 Thomas G. Healey (1818–1897), Atlanta real estate developer, politician, street railway entrepreneur and banker
 Thomas J. Healey (born 1942), lecturer at the Kennedy School Of Government
 T. J. Healey (c. 1866–1944), American horse racing trainer